Pedro Francisco Bono Institute (ISB) (formerly Pedro Francisco Bonó Philosophical Institute) began in September 1985 offering philosophical and humanities studies for Jesuits preparing for the priesthood. Classes were held at the San Pedro Claver Juniorate on Samana Street, Santo Domingo, Dominican Republic. In 1989 the Institute moved to its present location and began offering the Bachelor of Arts and Philosophy degree. It is a member of the Association of Universities Entrusted to the Society of Jesus in Latin America (AUSJAL) and is affiliated with the Pontifical Gregorian University.

See also
 List of Jesuit sites

References  

Jesuit universities and colleges
Educational institutions established in 1985
1985 establishments in the Dominican Republic